The Fifth Chapter (also stylized as T5C) is the seventeenth studio album by German band Scooter released on 26 September 2014.

Background 
The Fifth Chapter is the first album by Scooter to not feature production by Rick J. Jordan, after his departure at the start of 2014. Jordan was replaced by Phil Speiser. It is also the first album which was released on vinyl LP since 1996's Our Happy Hardcore.

Track listing 
All tracks produced by Scooter, except "Today" and "Radiate" produced by Scooter and Vassy.

Singles 
The first single was "Bigroom Blitz" which featured American rapper Wiz Khalifa. It was released on 23 May 2014.
The second single "Today" was released on 5 September 2014 as one-track single and on 26 September 2014 as maxi-single. 
The third single "Can't Stop the Hardcore" was released on 5 December 2014.
The fourth single "Radiate" featuring Vassy was released on 29 May 2015.

Personnel 
H.P. Baxxter – MC lyrics
Phil Speiser – mixer, engineer
Vassy – producer (track 3, 5), female vocals (track 3, 5)
Jessica Jean – vocals (track 7, 14, 16)
Yasmin K. – vocals (track 4)
Dan Priddy – additional vocals (track 10)
Gareth Owen – additional vocals (track 6)

Charts

Release history

Notes 
"Today" contains lyrics from "Discohopping" by Klubbheads.
"Bigroom Blitz" interpolates elements from "Hadi Bakalim" by Sezen Aksu, as written by Onno Tunç, and includes Wiz Khalifa's rap sample from the song "Yoko" by Berner feat. Wiz Khalifa, Chris Brown and Big K.R.I.T.. The T5C album includes re-recorded version of "Bigroom Blitz" where Wiz Khalifa's part is replaced with the one by the voice actor Cosmo Hickox due to copyright violation.
"Chopstick (Mado Kara Mieru)" is Scooter's version of the 2009's song "Mado Kara Mieru" from the album Calling All Dawns by Christopher Tin.
"Fuck Forever" contains a melody based on "Mammoth" by Dimitri Vegas & Like Mike with Moguai.
"Listen" contains samples from Avicii's remix of Lenny Kravitz's song "Superlove".
"Can't Stop the Hardcore" samples the melody from Greek dance Sirtaki and the singing melody from "Eviva España" by Samantha.
"T.O.O." stands for "The Only One". Scooter already have a song called The Only One therefore it has been shortened to T.O.O.*

References 

2014 albums
Scooter (band) albums